The Son of a Kapenta (abbreviated as SOAK) is the second studio album by Nigerian singer Brymo. It was released by Chocolate City on November 15, 2012. Recorded in English and Yoruba, the album combines elements of fuji music with contemporary pop and techno. It features guest appearances from Jesse Jagz, Pryse, M.I, Ice Prince and Efya. The album was produced by E Kelly, Mikky Me Joses, Legendury Beatz, Jesse Jagz, Blaze, DMM Oluremi and Kid Konnect. The Son of a Kapenta was supported by three singles: "Ara", "Good Morning" and "Go Hard". The album suffered a botched roll out and wasn't given the full big label push. As a result of this, it was included on The Nations list of the "Albums that failed commercially in 2012".

Background
Brymo started recording The Son of a Kapenta after signing a record deal with Chocolate City in 2010. His father's carpentry profession inspired the album's title. Prior to releasing his label debut "Ara", Brymo worked with label mates M.I, Jesse Jagz and Ice Prince to record "Action Film", "Love You" and "Oleku", respectively. The Son of a Kapenta is primarily a mixture of Afropop, fuji, soul, EDM and R&B. In a 2012 interview with The Punch newspaper, Brymo described the album as a summary of his life and said each song is a reflection of his energy. He also said he recorded the album to be identified by his body of work as a lead artist rather than as a featured artist.

Composition
Conceptually, the album is composed of three chapters: Birth, Dealer and Lover. The songs "1986", "Life is too Short", "Ara" and "Now Now" all fall within the Birth category, while "Go Hard", "Omoge Campus", "Rendezvous" and "Akara" fall under Dealer. The album's remaining tracks fit into the Lover category. On the album's opener "1986", Brymo is reminiscent about the sacrifices his mother made for him and the pain she went through giving birth to him. The Mikky Me Joses-produced track "Life is too Short" is a fusion of pop and EDM. The infectious track "Ara" fuses Afrobeat and techno.

In the Jesse Jagz-assisted track "Now Now", Brymo wants his blessings to occur quickly. The hip-hop-influenced track "Go Hard" is reminiscent of Timbaland & Magoo's "Drop". In the highlife-inspired track "Omoge Campus", Brymo sings about the love he has for a girl on campus. In "If You Were Mine", he ponders if his love interest will catch him when he falls. The dance track "Your Love" has an electro-pop feel. "See Me" has elements of rock music. The DMM Oluremi-produced track "We All Need Something" discusses what it takes to be human.

Singles and other releases
On September 18, 2011, Brymo released "Ara" as the album's lead single. It was produced by the record producing duo Legendury Beatz. He told Damiete Braide of The Sun that "Ara" is a slang term that loosely translates to Wonder. Brymo recorded the song while being under pressure from Chocolate City to submit a single. In an interview with Adeola Adeyemo of BellaNaija in July 2012, he said "Ara" was written six months after he recorded "Good Morning". The accompanying music video for "Ara" was released on December 31, 2011; it was directed by the production company Aje Filmworks. The video was primarily shown in monochrome with occasional bursts of color. Brymo won Best Recording of the Year for "Ara" and was nominated for Best Vocal Performance (Male) at The Headies 2012.

On April 16, 2012, Brymo released "Good Morning" as the album's second single. Its music video was also directed by Aje Filmworks and released on 30 July 2012. "Good Morning" was nominated for Best Recording of the Year at The Headies 2013. The album's third single "Go Hard" was released on September 26, 2012. It was written by Brymo and produced by Jesse Jagz. The song was described as an "energetic dance song" and has elements of Azonto. On March 28, 2013, Brymo released a documentary-style video for "Omoge Campus". It was shot in Ibadan and depicts the story of a NYSC member who is reminiscent about his significant other.

Critical reception

The Son of a Kapenta received positive reviews from music critics. In a review for music blog Jaguda, Ayo Jaguda awarded the album 9.5 stars out of 10, praising its production and commending everyone who worked on it. Jaguda also said the album was "well packaged" and felt like Brymo's "freshman album". Reviewing for Nigerian Entertainment Today, Ayomide Tayo granted the album 4 stars out of 5, commending Brymo for "composing songs that are well thought out and layered". Tayo also acknowledged Brymo for knocking together "different sounds, choruses, verses and ideas to create an album worthy of his status".

A writer for 360nobs, who goes by the moniker Shadenonconformist, rated the album 7.4 stars out of 10, praising its production and Brymo's voice. Shadenonconformist said the album "shows a lot of growth and maturity both in Brymo's sound and willingness to dabble in other music genres". Conversely, Shadenonconformist criticized it for sounding "repetitive at certain intervals". Ogaga Sakpaide of TooXclusive did a track-by-track review of the album and gave it 3.5 stars out of 5.

Tracklisting

Notes
 "—" denotes an interlude

Personnel

Olawale Ashimi – primary artist, writer
Jesse Abaga – featured artist, production 
Jane Awindor – featured artist
Pryse – featured artist
Panshak Zamani – featured artist
Jude Abaga – featured artist
E Kelly – production 
Mikky Me Joses – production 
Legendury Beatz – production 
Blaze – production 
DMM Oluremi – production 
Kid Konnect – production

Release history

References

2012 albums
Brymo albums
Yoruba-language albums
Albums produced by Legendury Beatz
Albums produced by Jesse Jagz
Albums produced by Kid Konnect
Chocolate City (music label) albums